Riccardo Forconi (born 13 June 1970, in Empoli) is a former Italian racing cyclist. He rode in 10 editions of the Giro d'Italia, 3 of the Tour de France and 1 of the Vuelta a España.

Major results

1995
2nd Giro della Provincia di Reggio Calabria
1996
2nd Trophée des Grimpeurs
5th Tour de Suisse
1998
3rd Giro di Toscana
1999
1st Stage 2 Giro del Trentino

References

1970 births
Living people
Italian male cyclists
People from Empoli
Cyclists from Tuscany
Sportspeople from the Metropolitan City of Florence